Richard D. Buckley (September 21, 1858 – December 12, 1929) was a Major League Baseball player. He played from 1888 to 1895.

Sources

Major League Baseball catchers
Indianapolis Hoosiers (NL) players
New York Giants (NL) players
St. Louis Browns (NL) players
Philadelphia Phillies players
Baseball players from New York (state)
1858 births
1929 deaths
East Liberty Liberty Stars players
Binghamton Bingoes players
Syracuse Stars (minor league baseball) players
Indianapolis Hoosiers (minor league) players
Grand Rapids Bob-o-links players
Columbus Senators players
Columbus Buckeyes (minor league) players
Grand Rapids Furniture Makers players
Chicago White Stockings (minor league) players
Omaha Omahogs players
19th-century baseball players